Teleskop was a Russian literary, philosophical and political magazine published in Moscow in 1831-1836 by Nikolai Nadezhdin, who was also its editor-in-chief. Originally a fortnightly publication, it became a weekly in 1834. Another Nadezhin's project, Molva (Молва, Rumour, 1831-1986), originally a 'news and fashion' magazine, in 1932 became a newspaper and literary supplement to Teleskop.

Among the authors whose works appeared in Teleskop regularly, were Mikhail Pogodin, Stepan Shevyryov, Alexander Pushkin, Fyodor Tyutchev, Alexander Polezhayev, Nikolai Stankevich and Alexey Koltsov. Vissarion Belinsky joined in 1833 to become a year later Nadezhdin's co-editor.

In 1836 the magazine published Pyotr Chaadaev's "Philosophical Letter" and was promptly closed, as was Molva.

References

1831 establishments in the Russian Empire
Defunct literary magazines published in Europe
Defunct magazines published in Russia
Magazines established in 1831
Magazines disestablished in 1836
Mass media in Moscow
Russian-language magazines
Literary magazines published in Russia
Weekly magazines published in Russia